Gengahr are an English indie rock band, formed in 2013 at Stoke Newington School in Hackney, London. 

Though originally named RES, they were forced to rename after discovering an artist already called RES on iTunes. Their new name is a play on Gengar, one of the original Pokémon. Their debut album, A Dream Outside, was released on 15 June 2015. In October 2017 it was announced their second album, Where Wildness Grows, would be released on 9 March 2018.

After BBC Radio 1 DJ Huw Stephens played their first single, "Fill My Gums With Blood" on his radio show, the band were invited to perform at the Introducing stage at the 2014 Glastonbury Festival.

Critical reception 

A Dream Outside received positive reviews from most music critics. At Metacritic, which assigns a normalised rating out of 100 to reviews from mainstream critics, the album received an average score of 79, based on 10 reviews, which indicates "almost entirely favourable reviews". Rhian Daly of NME described A Dream Outside as "an oddly soothing blend of dark romance and gentle psychedelia."

Gwilym Mumford of The Guardian praised the album as being subtly refined and "psychpop with heavy emphasis on the pop."

Haydon Spenceley of Clash Magazine wrote, "It might be jumping the gun a bit to call them the 'saviours of British guitar music', or anything along those lines, but it must surely rank amongst the finest guitar-driven debut album to be coughed up by British music thus far in 2015."

Discography

Studio albums

Singles

References

English indie rock groups
Dream pop musical groups
Stoke Newington
Musical groups from London
2013 establishments in England
Musical groups established in 2013
Transgressive Records artists